Pedicularia is a genus of small predatory or ectoparasitic sea snails, cowry-like marine gastropod molluscs in the family Ovulidae, the cowry allies.

In Peducularia sicula, the protoconch protrudes.

These snails live on and feed on certain corals.

Species
Species within the genus Pedicularia include:
 Pedicularia californica (Newcomb, 1864) - California pedicularia
 Pedicularia dautzenbergi (Schilder, 1931)
 Pedicularia decurvata Locard, 1897
 Pedicularia decussata (Gould, 1855) - hatched pedicularia
 † Pedicularia deshayesiana G. Seguenza, 1865 
 Pedicularia elegantissima Deshayes, 1863
 Pedicularia granulata Neubert, 1998
 Pedicularia japonica Dall, 1871
 Pedicularia morrisoni Lorenz, 2013
 Pedicularia pacifica Pease, 1865
 Pedicularia sicula Swainson, 1840
 Pedicularia splendida Lorenz, 2009
 Pedicularia stylasteris Hedley, 1903 
 Pedicularia subtilis Schilder, 1931
 Pedicularia vanderlandi Goud & Hoeksema, 2001
Species brought into synonymy
 Pedicularia albida Dall, 1881: synonym of Pedicularia decussata Gould, 1855
 Pedicularia bonfigliolii Cossignani, 2006: synonym of Pedicularia decussata Gould, 1855
 Pedicularia deshayesiana Seguenza, 1865: synonym of Pedicularia sicula Swainson, 1840
 Pedicularia ovuliformis Berry, 1946: synonym of Pedicularia californica Newcomb, 1864
 Pedicularia tibia Simone, 2005: synonym of Pedicularia decussata Gould, 1855

References

 Gofas, S.; Le Renard, J.; Bouchet, P. (2001). Mollusca, in: Costello, M.J. et al. (Ed.) (2001). European register of marine species: a check-list of the marine species in Europe and a bibliography of guides to their identification. Collection Patrimoines Naturels, 50: pp. 180–213
 Rolán E., 2005. Malacological Fauna From The Cape Verde Archipelago. Part 1, Polyplacophora and Gastropoda.
 Lorenz F. & Fehse D. (2009) The living Ovulidae. A manual of the families of allied cowries: Ovulidae, Pediculariidae and Eocypraeidae. Hackenheim: Conchbooks.

External links
 

Pediculariinae
Gastropod genera